The Department of Internal Affairs (DIA) is the public service department of New Zealand charged with issuing passports; administering applications for citizenship and lottery grants; enforcing censorship and gambling laws; registering births, deaths, marriages and civil unions; supplying support services to ministers; and advising the government on a range of relevant policies and issues.

Other services provided by the department include a translation service, publication of the New Zealand Gazette (the official government newspaper), a flag hire service, management of VIP visits to New Zealand, running the Lake Taupō harbourmaster's office (under a special agreement with the local iwi) and the administration of offshore islands.

History
The Department of Internal Affairs traces its roots back to the Colonial Secretary's Office, which from the time New Zealand became a British colony, in 1840, was responsible for almost all central government duties. The department was the first government department to be established in New Zealand, and it became the home for a diverse range of government functions providing services to New Zealanders and advice to Ministers of the Crown. A former Minister of Internal Affairs, Michael Bassett, wrote a history of the department, The Mother of All Departments, the title of which reflects this status. The department's role has changed over time as new departments and ministries have been formed.

The Colonial Secretary was the chief aide of the governor of New Zealand. Until 1848 his office dealt with all correspondence between the governor and his employees, and between officials and the public. Other early functions included inspecting sheep, running prisons, supervising government printing, licensing auctioneers, registering births, deaths and marriages, collecting statistics, and responsibility for gambling, fire brigades, constitutional matters (including running elections) and citizenship. Some of these functions are still duties of the modern department, which gained its present name in 1907, but other functions eventually grew into standalone government agencies. As the department's functions have changed over time, there has become a growing acknowledgement that it carries responsibility for all government functions which are not substantial enough to justify a standalone organisation or do not fit well into any other existing departments.

From 1853 the Colonial Secretary's Office coordinated the relationship between central government and provincial government and, when the provinces were abolished in 1876, took on responsibility for the new system of local government. Over the twentieth century the department's functions would include cultural affairs, civil defence, a translation service, conservation, tourism, sport and recreation, support for ethnic communities, and support services for government ministers.

Several new government departments have been formed by establishing new agencies around former Internal Affairs services. The electoral office moved to the Department of Justice before becoming an independent Electoral Commission in 2010. The Ministry of Industries and Commerce took over the statistics function in 1931; an independent Department of Statistics was created in 1957. The Department of Conservation was established in 1987 by merging the department's wildlife service with other smaller entities. The National Library of New Zealand and Archives New Zealand were separated from the department in the late 1990s but merged back in 2011. A standalone Ministry of Cultural Affairs (now the Ministry for Culture and Heritage, which in the present day also has responsibility for the sport and recreation portfolio) was established in 1991. The department briefly held responsibility for tourism from 1998 until 2000, when this was combined with other former Ministry of Commerce functions in the new Ministry of Economic Development, now the Ministry of Business, Innovation and Employment. The National Emergency Management Agency, which had been a business unit within the department since before World War II, was transferred to the Department of the Prime Minister and Cabinet in 2009. The Office of Ethnic Communities, originally a single part-time position within the department, became the new Ministry for Ethnic Communities in 2021.

The department has also gained responsibilities that previously belonged to other agencies. In 2009 the department took responsibility for government technology services from the State Services Commission. The Office for the Community and Voluntary Sector was transferred to the department from the Ministry of Social Development in 2011.

Structure 
The head of the department holds concurrent roles as Chief Executive, Secretary for Internal Affairs, Secretary for Local Government and Government Chief Digital Officer.

Business groups 
As at 7 July 2022:

 Toi Hiranga – Regulation and Policy
 Te Haumi – Enterprise Partnerships
 Kāwai ki te Iwi – Service Delivery and Operations
 Ue te Hīnatore – Local Government
 Te Kōuti Whitiwhiti – Digital Public Service
 He Pou Aronui – Organisational Capability and Services
 Te Urungi – Organisational Strategy and Performance
 Office of the Chief Executive

Related organisations 
The department provides secretariat support for several entities including:

 The Gambling Commission
 The Local Government Commission
 Commissions of Inquiry and ad hoc bodies such as the Royal Commission of Inquiry on Historic Abuse in State Care and in the Care of Faith-based Institutions
 The Library and Information Advisory Commission, Ngā Kaiwhakamārama i ngā Kohikohinga Kōrero
 The Public Lending Right Advisory Group
 The Guardians Kaitiaki of the Alexander Turnbull Library
 The Archives Council
 The Film and Literature Board of Review
 The Confidential Listening and Assistance Service

Ministers 
The department serves 7 portfolios and 6 ministers. In addition, the department also has responsibilities to the Minister of Finance in relation to community trusts and to the Minister of Foreign Affairs in relation to the Peace and Disarmament Education Trust and the Pacific Development Conservation Trust.

See also
 New Zealand Birth Certificate
 Censorship in New Zealand
 Gambling in New Zealand
 Five Nations Passport Group

Bibliography
 Bassett, Michael The Mother of All Departments (1997, Auckland University Press, Auckland)

References

External links
 
 Local Government Commission
 Ministry of Civil Defence
 Office of Ethnic Affairs

Internal affairs
Society of New Zealand
New Zealand
Ministries established in 1840
Financial regulatory authorities of New Zealand
1840 establishments in New Zealand